Sorkh Deh or Sorkhdeh or Surkhdeh may refer to:

Sorkh Deh, Kermanshah
Sorkh Deh, Qom
Surkhdeh, Tehran
Sorkh Deh, Semnan

See also
Sorkheh Deh (disambiguation)